Union Township is an inactive township in Lincoln County, in the U.S. state of Missouri.

Union Township was established in 1819.

References

Townships in Missouri
Townships in Lincoln County, Missouri